Quest is a 1978 board game published by Heritage Models under the name of Gametime Games.

Gameplay
Quest is a game about the Knights of the Round Table in which the Knights go forth from Camelot on specific quests which they must complete before returning.

Reception
Norman S. Howe reviewed Quest in The Space Gamer No. 22. Howe commented that "Quest is Dungeon taken outdoors. For so simple a game, it is surprisingly true to the Arthurian legend."

References

Board games introduced in 1978
Games based on Arthurian legend
Heritage Models games